William Marsden (24 November 1860 – 10 May 1942) was a British sports shooter. He competed at the 1908 Summer Olympics winning a bronze medal in the moving target small-bore rifle event.

References

1860 births
1942 deaths
British male sport shooters
Olympic shooters of Great Britain
Shooters at the 1908 Summer Olympics
Olympic bronze medallists for Great Britain
Olympic medalists in shooting
Medalists at the 1908 Summer Olympics
Sportspeople from Southport